Rachel Anderson (born 1943) is an English journalist and author best known for her children's books. Her work often features the positive portrayal of characters with learning disabilities, and themes of social injustice and alienation. She was married for 45 years to the writer and translator David Bradby. Her mother was the writer Verily Anderson. 

For the novel Paper Faces, published by OUP in 1991, Anderson won the Guardian Children's Fiction Prize, a once-in-a-lifetime book award judged by a panel of British children's writers.

Biography

Born in 1943 in Hampton Court, Surrey, Rachel Anderson is the second of the five children born to Verily Anderson and Captain Donald Anderson, her siblings including the Janie Hampton and the television producer Eddie Anderson.

Leaving school at the age of 16, Rachel Anderson initially became a journalist, working for BBC Radio, newspapers and women's magazines. For 10 years she was children's book reviews editor for Good Housekeeping. Her first book – Pineapple, an adult novel – was published in 1965, in the same week that she and David Bradby were married. Her other books for adults are The Purple Heart Throbs: The Sub-Literature of Love (1974), Dream Lovers (1978), and For the Love of Sang (1990). She now writes mainly for a young readership.

Her 2011 novel for teenagers, Asylum, was published in the same week as her mother's final book that was being completed at the time of her death the previous year.

Rachel Anderson has four children and "a range of grandchildren" and lives mainly in Cromer, Norfolk.

Works

Children's and young adult books
Moffatt's Road (1978)
Tim Walks (1985)
Jessy Runs Away (1988)
French Lessons (1988)
Tough as Old Boots (1988)
The Bus People (1989)
Julie and the Queen of Tonga (1990)
Best Friends (1991)
Treasures for Cousin Crystal (1992)
The Working Class (1993)
Jessy and the Long-short Dress (1993)
Black Water (1994)
The Doll's House (1995)
Princess Jazz and the Angels (1995)
Letters from Heaven (1996)
Blackthorn, Whitethorn (1997)Carly's Luck (1998)Ollie and the Trainers (1999)The Scavenger's Tale (2000)The War Orphan (1984, 2000)The Flight of the Emu (2001)Joe's Story (2001)Paper Faces (2002)The Rattletrap Trip (2003)Hello Peanut! (2003)Hugo and the Long Red Arm (2004)Pizza on Saturday (2004)The Poacher's Son (2006)Warlands (2006)This Strange New Life (2006)Red Moon (2006)Big Ben (2007)Asylum (2011)

The Little Angel Trilogy:Little Angel Comes to Stay (1984)Little Angel, Bonjour (1988)Happy Christmas Little Angel (1991)

Moving Times' Trilogy:Bloom of Youth (1999)Grandmother's Footsteps (1999)Stronger than Mountains (2000)

Adult booksPineapple (Jonathan Cape, 1965)Dream Lovers (1978)For the Love of Sang (1990)

Literary criticismThe Purple Heart Throbs: The Sub-literature of Love (1974)

TranslationsThe Cat's Tale (1985) Renard the Fox (1986) with D. BradbyWild Goose Chase (1986)Little Lost Fox (1992)

 Awards 

 1949: Tiny Tots Order of Merit (TTOM)
 1992: Guardian Children's Fiction Prize for Paper Faces'' (one of two winners)
 1990: Medical Journalists' Award

See also

References

External links 
 
 

1943 births
Date of birth missing (living people)
20th-century English novelists
20th-century English women writers
21st-century English women writers
British women children's writers
British women journalists
British women non-fiction writers
English children's writers
English women novelists
Guardian Children's Fiction Prize winners
Living people
20th-century British journalists
21st-century British journalists